The official religion in Bhutan is Vajrayana  Buddhism, which is practiced by almost 85% of the population. Bhutan is a Buddhist country by constitution and Buddhism plays a vital role in the country. Buddhism is the cultural heritage of Bhutan and its people's identity as well. Freedom of religion is guaranteed by the King. Approximately 85 percent of the population of 770,000 follow either the Drukpa Lineage of the Kagyu school, the Nyingma school of Tibetan Buddhism or another school of Buddhism. Almost 12 percent (11.3 percent ), mainly Lhotshampas, practice Hinduism.

Buddhism

The Ngalop people, descendants of Tibetan immigrants, comprise the majority of the population in the western and central areas and mostly follow the Drukpa Lineage of Kagyu Vajrayana.

The Sharchops, descendants of the country's probable original inhabitants, live in the east. Reportedly, some Sharchops practice Buddhism combined with elements of Bon whereas others practice animism and Hinduism.

The government supports both Kagyu and Nyingma Buddhist monasteries. The royal family practices a combination of Nyingma and Kagyu Buddhism and many citizens believe in the concept of "Kanyin-Zungdrel," meaning "Kagyupa and Ningmapa as one."

Hinduism

Hindus, mainly in the South, practice Hinduism. There are about 92,167 Hindus mainly of Lhotshampa ethnicity living in Bhutan. They form 12% of the country's population, and Hinduism is the second largest religion of the nation. The very first Hindu temple was constructed in Thimphu in 2012 by the Je Khenpo, Chief Abbot of Bhutan, and Hindus practice their religion in small to medium-sized groups.
Hinduism is more common among the Lhotshampa ethnic group, although a fair amount of ethnic Lhotshampa follow Buddhism as well.

Bon

Bon, the country's animist and shamanistic belief system, revolves around the worship of nature and predates Buddhism. Although Bön priests often officiate and include Bön rituals in Buddhist festivals, very few citizens adhere exclusively to this religious group.

Christianity

Christians are present in small numbers, especially in the Nepalese ethnic group. According to a 2007 report there were no Christian missionaries in the country, although international Christian relief organizations and Roman Catholic Jesuit priests engaged in education and humanitarian activities.
Christianity was first brought to Bhutan in the late 17th century by Portuguese Jesuits, but the teachings failed to gain much traction among the devout Bhutanese Buddhists.

Islam
In 2010, the Pew Research Center estimated that 0.1% of the population were Muslims and Islam has no recognition there according to Bhutan constitution.

Freedom and regulation of religion

The law provides for freedom of religion; the religious institutions and personalities have a duty "to promote the spiritual heritage of the country while also ensuring that religion remains separate from politics" and that religious institutions and personalities remain "above politics." Reflecting the government's stated purpose of preserving individuals' religious and cultural values, the above prohibitive clauses in the Constitution have been interpreted to apply to proselytism and to prohibit religious personalities from voting, respectively.

The Religious Organizations Act of 2007 aims to protect and preserve the spiritual heritage of Bhutan through providing for the registration and administration of religious organizations. To meet those goals, the Act creates the Chhoedey Lhentshog as the regulatory authority on religious organizations. This body regulates, monitors, and keeps records on all religious organizations in Bhutan, which are in turn required to register and maintain specified corporate formalities.

Through 2007, there were no reports of violence associated with pressure to conform to Vajrayana beliefs. There were no reports of societal abuse or discrimination based on religious belief or practice.

See also

 List of Buddhist temples in Bhutan

References